The Voice is the third extended play by South Korean group SG Wannabe. It was released on August 19, 2015, by CJ E&M Music and B2M Entertainment.

The EP was a commercial success peaking at number 5 on the Gaon Album Chart. The EP sold 10,463 physical copies as of October 2015.

Release 
The EP was released on August 19, 2015, through several music portals, including Melon, and iTunes, for the global market.

Commercial performance 
The Voice entered and peaked at number 5 on the Gaon Album Chart on the chart issue dated August 16-22, 2015. In its second week, the EP fell to number 13 and in its third week to number 23. In its fourth week, the EP placed at number 45, climbed to number 39 the following week and to number 31 in its sixth week. The EP climbed to number 22 in its eleventh week, before dropping the chart the following week.

The EP placed at number 14 on the chart for the month of August 2015, with 7,723 physical copies sold. It also charted at number 42 in September with 1,283 copies and at number 46 in October with 1,457 copies. The EP sold over 10,000 copies in 2015.

Track listing 
Digital download

Charts

Release history

References 

2015 EPs
SG Wannabe albums